The following is a list of county-maintained roads in Pennington County, Minnesota, United States. Some of the routes included in this list are also county state-aid highways (CSAH).



Route list

See also

References

 

Pennington
Transportation in Pennington County, Minnesota